Say Hello to Goodbye is the first extended play and debut release on a record label by Canadian singer-songwriter Alee. It was released through Wax Records on July 10, 2015. The EP has spawned four singles, including "Moonshine", which was Alee's first Top-20 hit on the Billboard Canada Country airplay chart.

Promotion
Alee embarked upon a promotional radio tour in support of "Moonshine" in the spring of 2015 and followed that with a tour of summer festivals to support the EP in the summer of 2015, kicking off on Canada Day (July 1), 2015 in St. Albert, Alberta.

Singles
The EP's lead single, "Only the Strong Survive", was released October 14, 2014. It failed to enter the all-genre Billboard Canadian Hot 100, but peaked at number 32 on the magazine's Canada Country airplay chart. 

"Moonshine", co-written by labelmate Alyssa Reid, was released April 21, 2015 as the EP's second official single. It has been cited as a standout track by critics. The song has reached a peak position of 20 on the Canada Country chart, a career-high peak. 

"Say Hello to Goodbye" was released October 21, 2015 as the EP's third radio single. It failed to enter the country airplay chart.

A fourth single, "Are You Alone", was released to radio August 1, 2016.

Critical reception
Kyle Mullin of Exclaim! rated the EP 7/10, comparing it favorably to Taylor Swift's earlier, country-inspired work. "Fans of the genre... will surely adore it," writes Mullin, "but crucially, there's something here for outsiders, too, as Alee's true talents lie not only in her ability to conform to Nashville norms, but in the way she subtly adds her own spin."

Taryn McElheran of Confront Magazine was also positive in her 4 stars out of 5 review. She praised the collection's combination of "typical country love/heartbreak songs" and more upbeat material, and wrote that it is "really hard not to enjoy her smooth, twangy tunes."

Track listing

Chart performance

Singles

References

2015 EPs